The Pran Buri River is a river in Prachuap Khiri Khan Province, Thailand, on the Kra Isthmus of the Malay Peninsula. The Pran Buri River originates in southern part of the Kaeng Krachan National Park in the Tenasserim Hills and after  empties into the Gulf of Thailand. The only town along the river course is Pran Buri, the center of the Pran Buri District.

The Pran Buri dam was built in 1978, to protect lowlands from flooding as well as to have steady water flow for irrigation.

At the river's estuary at the Gulf of Thailand is Pran Buri Forest Park, covering  of mixed forest and mangrove forest. It was created in 1982.

Rivers of Thailand